Palahi (also Plahay, Plahey, Plahi or Palahy) is an historical village in Kapurthala, Punjab, India. Palahi is near Phagwara. Neighbouring villages include Khurampur, Khatti, Barn, Kishanpur, Nangal Maja and Dhak Palahi.

Demographics

 

According to the 2011 census, Palahi had a population of 2,745, mainly Jatt Sikhs, with a lesser population of Tarkhan Sikhs, Khatri Sikhs and Hindus. They originate from the regions of Kapurthala in Punjab.

History
According to local legend, Palahi takes its name from Palah (Butea monosperma trees) found in abundance in the area in times gone by.

Gurduara Chhevin Paatshahi
Palahi is the site of the Gurdwara, 'Chhevin Patshahi' Sri Guru Hargobind Sahib Ji to commemorate a battle in 1635, between Sri Guru Hargobind Ji and the invading Mughal forces. Many Sikhs perished during the battle, however, they still emerged victorious. It is during this time that Guru Ji also visited Domeli and Babeli passing Lakhpur before visiting Palahi.

Jor Mela
Palahi has been hosting a Jor Mela in connection with the Aagman Purb (arrival) of Sri Guru Hargobind Sahib Ji in the village since 1917. The Jor Mela lasts for three days and relates to the 1635 battle of Palahi.

Education
The villagers of Village Palahi with the help of NRIs established the first school in Palahi. The school was set up by prominent villagers including Babu Kartar Singh, Guljara Singh Sagoo, Darbara Singh, Chanda Singh and Atman Singh Sagoo etc. They set up a small school, consisting only of two teachers and ten students.
They sought help in developing the Education system, by travelling to Kapurthala and confrontingMaharaja Jagatjit Singh for help. They were then granted funding to build the school, and were able to pay five teachers' salary. Palahi now offers comprehensive education from primary school up to senior secondary school.
In addition to this, Prominent Persons of Phagwara Area including S. Jagat Singh Palahi, S. Bhagat Singh Sagoo, S. Sampuran Singh Ranipur, S. Tarlochan Singh, Advocate S. N. Chopra and Prof. Piara Singh Bhogal formed an NGO Named National Rural Development Society, Palahi in 1983 and they Started a Rural Institute named National Institute for Integrated Rural Development and Transfer of Technology, Palahi in 1986, which is still successful and running today.
in the year 2014, Industrial Training Institutes is started in name of Jagat Singh Palahi . This Jagat Singh Palahi Industrial Training Institute is a training institute which provide training in technical field and run under Directorate General of Employment & Training (DGET), Ministry of Labour & Employment, Union Government of India and Department of Technical Education and Industrial Training (IT Wing), Govt. of Punjab.

Financial institutions
Punjab National Bank, Punjab & Sind Bank, Cooperative Bank and ATM and Cooperative Society are also available for financial activity.

Health facility
Government Primary Health Center,
Government Ayurvec Health Center, 
Veterinary Hospital and other Private Hospital are available for health facility.

Playground
There are many playgrounds and gyms available for physical fitness.

Places

Location
The ancient village Palahi is situated at National Highway 344A (Chandigarh Road) which is 2 km from Phagwara, in north side.

References

External links
 Website of the Palahi village

Villages in Kapurthala district